Duga is an administrative ward in Tanga District of Tanga Region in Tanzania. 
According to the 2012 census, the ward has a total population of 18,704. The late Shaaban Robert, the national poet had a home in Duga ward and its the wards largest attraction.

References

Wards of Tanga Region